American rapper Aminé has released three studio albums, four mixtapes, one extended play, sixteen singles (including four singles as a featured artist), and six promotional singles. Aminé released his debut mixtape, Odyssey to Me, which was followed up by his debut extended play, En Vouge, with both projects being released in 2014. Aminé went on to release his second mixtape, Calling Brío, in August 2015. In March 2016, Aminé released his breakthrough single "Caroline", which peaked at number 11 on the US Billboard Hot 100 chart. The song was later certified 6× platinum by the RIAA.

Aminé's debut studio album Good for You was released in July 2017 and peaked at number 31 on the US Billboard 200 chart. The album spawned the singles: "Caroline", "Heebiejeebies", "Turf", "Wedding Crashers" and "Spice Girl".

Albums

Studio albums

Mixtapes

Extended plays

Singles

As lead artist

As featured artist

Promotional singles

Other charted songs

Guest appearances

Music videos

As lead artist

As featured artist

Notes

References

Discographies of American artists
Hip hop discographies